The Betrayer is a 1921 Australian-New Zealand lost film from director Beaumont Smith about an interracial romance between a white Australian man and a Māori girl.

Plot
Australian Stephen Manners (Cyril Mackay) travels to New Zealand and has sex with a Māori girl. He goes home and she dies giving birth to their daughter, Iwa. Iwa is raised by her grandfather Hauraki (Mita), who explains to Manners what happens when he returns to New Zealand twenty years later. Manners takes Iwa (now played by Stella Southern) back to Sydney, Australia, but does not tell her that he is her father.

Travelling with Manners is John Barris (John Cosgrove), whom Hauraki tells on his deathbed that Iwa's real father actually is a missionary, not Manners. Barris keeps this information to himself and makes advances on Iwa, which are stopped by Manners.

Iwa tells Manners she is in love with him, so Manner explains he is her father and she returns to Rotarua. Barris' wife (Bernice Vere) tells Manners the truth so he returns to New Zealand and is reunited with Iwa, this time as a romantic couple.

Cast
Stella Southern as Iwa
Cyril Mackay as Stephen Manners
John Cosgrove as John Barris
Marie D'Alton as Mrs Manners
Mita, Chief of the Arawa as Hauraki
Bernice Vere as Eleanor Barris
Maggie/Bella Papakura
Guide Susan
Herbert Lee
Raymond Hatton
Dunstan Webb

Production
The film was shot on location in Rotorua and Auckland, New Zealand, at Coogee Beach and the Wentworth Hotel in Sydney, with about twelve cast and crew. Among them was Smith's assistant, Rudall Hayward, who later became one of New Zealand's most prolific directors.

Most stories of interracial romance at this time ended unhappily but this one finished with a white man marrying a Māori woman.

Release
The movie was originally entitled Our Bit o' the World, but this was changed out of fear audiences would think it was a travelogue.

In 1922, Smith re-edited the film for the British market, adding a racecourse scene and a chase between a car and a train, probably taken from his earlier movie, Desert Gold (1919). He retitled the movie The Maid of Maoriland, a title under which the film was re-released in Australia.

References

External links
The Betrayer in the Internet Movie Database
The Betrayer at National Film and Sound Archive

1921 films
Australian silent feature films
Films directed by Beaumont Smith
New Zealand silent films
Lost Australian films
Lost New Zealand films
Australian black-and-white films
1921 lost films